The 1896 Ohio State Buckeyes football team represented Ohio State University as an independent during the 1896 college football season. Led by Charles A. Hickey in his first and only year as head coach, Ohio State compiled a record of 5–5–1.

Schedule

References

Ohio State
Ohio State Buckeyes football seasons
Ohio State Buckeyes football